The Mozambique thicket rat (Grammomys cometes) is an African species of rodent in the mouse family, Muridae.
It is found in Mozambique, South Africa, and Zimbabwe.
Its natural habitat is subtropical or tropical dry forests.

References

 Taylor, P. 2004.  Grammomys cometes.   2006 IUCN Red List of Threatened Species.   Downloaded on 19 July 2007.

Grammomys
Rodents of Africa
Mammals described in 1908
Taxa named by Oldfield Thomas
Taxonomy articles created by Polbot